Freedom fighter Md Abdul Hamid cantonment is a Bangladeshi military cantonment in Mithamain, Kishoreganj. Prime Minister Sheikh Hasina inaugurated the newly built Cantonment on 28 February 2023. The Abdul Hamid Cantonment is built on 275 acres of land. The cantonment built beside the Ghorauta river.

References 

Cantonments of Bangladesh
Kishoreganj District